Morocco competed at the 2009 Mediterranean Games held in Pescara, Italy.

Medal Count

Number of Entries by Sport

See also
 Mediterranean Games
 2009 Mediterranean Games medal table
 European Olympic Committees

References

Nations at the 2009 Mediterranean Games
2009
Mediterranean Games